KCFJ (570 AM) is a radio station broadcasting a number of different formats Adult Standards via Dial Global, Talk via The Rush Limbaugh Show. In 2018, KCFJ became an affiliate of CBS News airing various Radio News Programming such as Eye on The White House, Jill on Money, Eye on Tech and Dr. Phil. Licensed to Alturas, California, United States, it serves the city of Alturas and neighboring communities.  The station is currently owned by Edi Media, Inc.

.

External links
KCFJ Website

CFJ
Alturas, California
China Radio International